Newcastle Sixth Form College is a Sixth-form college in Newcastle upon Tyne, England. Opened in March 2014, the college forms part of the larger organisation, Newcastle College. It offers around 40 different A Level subjects, the International Baccalaureate, and an access to A Levels GCSE programme.

The college is located on Westmorland Road, in Newcastle City Centre. Due to its close proximity to both Central Station Metro station, and Newcastle Central Station, the college attracts students from across Tyneside and surrounding regions including Northumberland and Sunderland.

Facilities
Dance and drama studios
Digital media centre
Science laboratories
Art and design workshops
Art and design studio space
Art exhibition space
Darkroom
Free Wi-Fi
Interactive whiteboards
Debating chamber
Costa Coffee outlet

References

External links
 

Education in Newcastle upon Tyne
Further education colleges in Tyne and Wear
Higher education colleges in England
Learning and Skills Beacons
Workfare in the United Kingdom